Katalin Pál-Ribáry (born 28 July 1947) is a Hungarian rower. She competed at the 1976 Summer Olympics and the 1980 Summer Olympics.

References

External links
 

1947 births
Living people
Hungarian female rowers
Olympic rowers of Hungary
Rowers at the 1976 Summer Olympics
Rowers at the 1980 Summer Olympics
People from Vác
Sportspeople from Pest County